Siege of Lilybaeum may refer to:
 Siege of Lilybaeum (250–241 BC)
 Siege of Lilybaeum (278 BC)